Flight 245 may refer to:

Air India Flight 245, crashed on 3 November 1950
Aeroflot Flight 245, crashed on 17 December 1961

0245